Symsarna is a river of Poland, a tributary of the Łyna River in Lidzbark Warmiński.

Rivers of Poland
Rivers of Warmian-Masurian Voivodeship